Robert Harry Hassard  (March 26, 1929 – December 30, 2010) was a Canadian ice hockey player. He played 126 games in the National Hockey League with the Toronto Maple Leafs and Chicago Black Hawks between 1949 and 1954. The rest of his career, which lasted from 1948 to 1960, was spent in the minor leagues. Hassard was born in Lloydminster, Saskatchewan and raised in Toronto, Ontario. He was a long-time resident and coach in Stouffville, Ontario. He died in December 2010 and was survived by his son Bill, a Leaf draft pick in 1974, and daughters Kim and Jacqui, nine grandchildren and six great-grandchildren. His wife, Helen, died in 2009.

Playing career
Bob Hassard played junior hockey with the Toronto Marlboros and won the Allan Cup with the team in the 1949–50 season. The same year he broke into the NHL, playing a single game for the Toronto Maple Leafs. Also a baseball player, the Brooklyn Dodgers offered him $100 a month to play for their farm team. Hassard turned down the offer, figuring he could earn more as a hockey player.

He shifted between the NHL and AHL throughout most of his career, winning a championship with the AHL's Pittsburgh Hornets in 1951–1952, and again in 1954=1955. In 129 NHL games Hassard recorded 9 goals, 28 assists (37 points), and only 22 penalty minutes.

He won the Stanley Cup in 1951 with the Toronto Maple Leafs.

Career statistics

Regular season and playoffs

References

External links
 

1929 births
2010 deaths
Buffalo Bisons (AHL) players
Canadian ice hockey centres
Chicago Blackhawks players
Ice hockey people from Saskatchewan
Ontario Hockey Association Senior A League (1890–1979) players
Sportspeople from Lloydminster
Pittsburgh Hornets players
Ice hockey people from Toronto
Stanley Cup champions
Toronto Maple Leafs players
Toronto Marlboros players